Prago Union is a Czech hip hop group. The current members are MC Kato (a.k.a. Deph) and DJ Maro. DJ Maro joined Prago Union in 2008, replacing DJ Skupla. Deph and Skupla were previously members of the group Chaozz.

History

The group's first record was HDP (Hrubý domácí produkt; English: gross domestic product). Guests on this album included  American producer Kutmasta Kurt and rappers Masta Ace and Planet Asia. The second record, Dezorient Express, was released five years later in spring 2010. It had 22 tracks and was produced in collaboration with DJ Maro and Paulie Garand from the band BPM. This record received positive reviews, including a 9/10 rating from hip-hop magazine Bbarak and a 10/10 and "Album of the Week" from musicserver.cz.

On 1 September 2011 their third record V Barvách (In Colors) was released, a concept album attempting to represent different colours in music.

On 16 June 2013 they released the album Vážná hudba (Classical music).

Discography 
 HDP (2005)
 Dezorient Express (Disorient Express) (2010)
 V Barvách (In Colours) (2011)
 Vážná hudba (Classical Music), (2013)
 Smrt žije (Death Lives) (2016)
 Perpetum promile (Perpetum per mille) (2019)
 Made In Strašnice (2021)

References

Czech hip hop groups
Musical groups established in 2002
2002 establishments in the Czech Republic